Pablo Cruise is the debut album by the California soft rock group Pablo Cruise, released in 1975.

Track listing

Side One
"Island Woman" (David Batteau, David Jenkins, Cory Lerios) - 5:02
"Denny" (David Jenkins, Cory Lerios) - 3:01
"Sleeping Dogs" (Bud Cockrell) - 3:52
"What Does it Take" (David Jenkins, Cory Lerios) - 4:51
"Rock 'N' Roller" (Bud Cockrell) - 5:21

Side Two
"Not Tonight" (Ron Nagle) - 3:01
"In My Own Quiet Way" (Bradford Craig, David Jenkins, Cory Lerios) - 4:15
"Ocean Breeze" (David Jenkins, Cory Lerios) - 12:24

Personnel
Pablo Cruise
David Jenkins - acoustic guitar, electric guitar, vocals
Steve Price - percussion, drums
Bud Cockrell - bass, vocals
Cory Lerios - piano, backing vocals

Additional musicians
Michael Utley - organ
Bobbye Hall Porter - additional percussion on "Island Woman" and "Denny"

Production
Michael James Jackson - producer
Larry Forkner - engineer
Norm Kinney - engineer, remixing
Russ Landau - project coordinator
David Paich - arranger, conductor, keyboards, string arrangements

References

Pablo Cruise albums
1975 debut albums
A&M Records albums
Albums recorded at Sunset Sound Recorders
Albums recorded at A&M Studios